Ganga Sridhar Raju (born 25 April 1993) is an Indian cricketer. He made his first-class debut for Tamil Nadu in the 2016–17 Ranji Trophy on 1 January 2017. He made his List A debut for Tamil Nadu in the 2016–17 Vijay Hazare Trophy on 25 February 2017. He made his Twenty20 debut for Tamil Nadu in the 2017–18 Syed Mushtaq Ali Trophy on 21 January 2018.

References

External links
 

1993 births
Living people
Indian cricketers
Tamil Nadu cricketers
People from Kakinada